Pola, officially the Municipality of Pola,  is a 3rd class municipality in the province of Oriental Mindoro, Philippines. According to the 2020 census, it has a population of 35,455 people.

Pola is the birthplace of former vice president and currently news anchor veteran ABS-CBN broadcaster Noli de Castro and DZMM Broadcaster and Field Reporter Noel Alamar.

Geography

Barangays
Pola is politically subdivided into 23 barangays.

Climate

Demographics

Economy

References

External links
Pola Profile at PhilAtlas.com
[ Philippine Standard Geographic Code]
Philippine Census Information
Local Governance Performance Management System

Municipalities of Oriental Mindoro